Proenza is a surname. Notable people with the surname include:

Bill Proenza, American meteorologist
Luis M. Proenza (born 1944), American university president
Reynaldo Proenza (born 1984), Cuban shot putter

See also
Proenza Schouler, an American clothing brand